Francisco José Ramos (born in Caguas in 1950) is a Puerto Rican philosopher, poet, and retired university professor. He is the author of the philosophical trilogy Aesthetics of Thought. He is also a numerary member of the Puerto Rican Spanish Academy.

Biography 
Ramos was born on December 31, 1950, in Caguas, Puerto Rico. He completed a master's degree (1976) and Ph.D (1982) in Philosophy at the Complutense University of Madrid. His studies focused on the philosophy of Friedrich Nietzsche, with a master's thesis titled Thought and Metaphor in Nietzsche’s Zarathustra and a doctoral dissertation titled The Thought of Transgression in the Nietzschean Philosophical Project. He attended University of Paris VIII (1977-1979) for his postdoctoral studies. Immediately after, he began a career as a professor at the University of Puerto Rico.

Ramos is also a founding member of the Puerto Rican Society of Philosophy (SPF, in Spanish), which he led from 1989 to 1991. He has been a guest lecturer and researcher at Georgetown University and the City University of New York, as well as universities in Europe, Asia and the Americas. He is a collaborator of the Hispanic Institute for Buddhist Studies and the European interdisciplinary group "Escritura e Imagen".

Thought 
Ramos' philosophical thought, as illustrated in his three-volume Aesthetics of Thought, questions thought as a philosophical category in its relation to language (or writing), and consequently, to the Real. His work combines approaches from Ancient philosophy—specifically Heraclitus and Parmenides—with other modern and contemporary traditions, such as Psychoanalysis, Ontology and Buddhism.

Works

The Drama of Philosophical Writing (1998): 
In the first volume of Aesthetics of Thought, Francisco José Ramos establishes a philosophical proposal that concerns aesthetics, not in its conventional philosophical sense, that is, judgments on beauty, but as a type of sensibility. Thought is not addressed as a mental activity, but rather as the plurality of images and configurations that constitute said activity. Fundamental to the proposal of Aesthetic of Thought is the acknowledgment of impermanence as that which escapes any configuration or conceptual framework— the original “articulation” is encoded into the written word or the “movements of the thinking”, presumed to be violently captured by the concept.

The Dance in the Labyrinth (2003): 
The second volume, Dance in the Labyrinth: Meditation upon Human Action (2003), attends to the particular relationship between philosophical language and art. This volume also poses several questions regarding the connections between philosophical thought and capitalism, specifically, the relationship between thought and the advertising industry. Accordingly, Ramos introduces conceptual distinctions between aesthetics, the work of art, and artistic experience, the last of which is related to the practice of wisdom.

The Invention of the Self (2008): 
The third volume of the trilogy, The Invention of the Self (2008), is conceived as a dialogue between the neurosciences, Psychoanalysis, and Buddhist thought. Therein Ramos outlines connections between mind, body, organism and brain. Ramos distances himself from existing attempts to reduce mental activity to a mere neuronal processes— to the dualist separations of mind and body. In doing so, he incorporates the non-dualistic legacy of Heraclitus, Lucretius, Marcus Aurelius, Spinoza, Hume, Nietzsche, Foucault, and Deleuze. Ramos thus delivers a proposal that accounts for the mind-body question and the urgent need to reach a different way of thinking about the human condition.

Selected works 

 Cronografías. Editorial Atlántida. (1982)
 Hacer: Pensar. Colección de escritos filosóficos. Editorial de la UPR. (1984). (Editor).
 “Tiempo y mito”, in Diccionario Internacional de Hermenéutica. Bilbao. Universidad de Deusto. (1997)
 Estética del Pensamiento I: el drama de la escritura filosófica. Editorial Fundamentos. (1998).
 Foucault, la historia de la locura como historia de la razón: recopilación de escritos conmemorativos de Historia de la locura. Editorial Tal Cual / Editorial Post Data. (2002). (Editor with Irma Rivera Nieves)
 “La otra Europa: la escritura americana con sus historias a la deriva”, in Discurso o Imagen: las paradojas de lo sonoro, Ana María Leyra. Editorial Fundamentos. (2003).
 Estética del pensamiento II: la danza en el laberinto. Editorial Fundamentos. (2003)
 Estética del pensamiento III: la invención de sí mismo. Editorial Fundamentos. (2008)
 La significación del lenguaje poético. Ediciones Antígona. (2012)
 Ética, de Baruch Spinoza. Trad. Manuel Machado. Ediciones Espuela de Plata. (2013). (Editor).
 La ciudad, la amistad, la palabra: encuentros filosóficos con Francisco José Ramos, Enrique Pajón y Diego Tatián. Ediciones Antígona. (2016).
 Erothema. La Palma Ediciones. (2017).
 The Holy Trinity of Power, Success, and Money. Poets, Philosophers, Lovers: On the Writings of Giannina Braschi. University of Pittsburgh Press.(2020).

References 

1950 births
Living people
20th-century Puerto Rican poets
21st-century Puerto Rican poets
Complutense University of Madrid alumni
People from Caguas, Puerto Rico
University of Puerto Rico faculty
Nietzsche scholars